Roy Lee "Chucky" Mullins (July 8, 1969 – May 6, 1991) was an American football player at Ole Miss (University of Mississippi) best known for the devastating football injury that left him a quadriplegic.

Accident and aftermath
Chucky Mullins was injured on October 28, 1989, during the Ole Miss Rebels' Homecoming game against the Vanderbilt Commodores in Oxford, Mississippi. Mullins plunged head-first into a tackle of Vanderbilt fullback Brad Gaines after a short pass attempt. The impact shattered four vertebrae in Mullins' cervical spine, immediately paralyzing him.

After being airlifted to Baptist Memorial Hospital in Memphis, Mullins underwent a tracheotomy and five-hour bone graft operation to fuse the vertebrae. Mullins never regained sensation below his neck. After months of intensive physical therapy, however, Mullins was eventually able to move a hand across his body and touch his chest.

As soon as the injury occurred, Mullins became the recipient of a huge outpouring of community support. Ole Miss fans, college football fans in the South and people from all over the nation immediately began to donate money towards Mullins' growing medical expenses. President George H. W. Bush visited Mullins in his hospital room and encouraged him while on a visit to Memphis. Soon, Ole Miss established the "Chucky Mullins Trust Fund" to properly manage the donations. The city of Oxford donated land for a specially-designed, handicap-accessible house for Mullins. Donations to the trust fund eventually exceeded $1 million.

Mullins returned to Ole Miss on June 20, 1990, to complete his undergraduate studies.

Death
Less than a year after returning to school, Mullins was stricken by a pulmonary embolism, caused by blood clots formed by inactivity and poor circulation. He died in the hospital on May 6, 1991, and was buried in his home town of Russellville, Alabama.

Memorials
On Sept. 26, 2014, Coliseum Drive on the Ole Miss campus was renamed Chucky Mullins Drive.

During Mullins' time in the hospital, he and Gaines, who did not know each other before the accident, became close friends. Since Mullins' death, Gaines visits and maintains his friend's gravesite three times a year: May 6 (the anniversary of Mullins' death), October 28 (the anniversary of the injury) and December 25 (Christmas Day). Brad Gaines continues this personal tradition to this day.

The impact of the accident on Gaines, and the injury to Mullins, is the subject of a SEC Storied documentary "It's Time", which first aired in September 2014 on the SEC Network.

Each spring, during the annual Grove Bowl (a game at the end of spring practices pitting Ole Miss players against each other), the player who most embodies Chucky Mullins' spirit and courage receives the "Chucky Mullins Memorial Courage Award". With the award, the player received the right to wear jersey number 38, the same number Chucky wore. Chucky's number 38 was retired on September 3, 2006, in a pregame ceremony before the Rebels' victory over Memphis. From 2006 until 2009, the winner of the "Chucky Mullins Memorial Courage Award" wore a patch in honor of this award. However, the retiring of Chucky's jersey #38 proved to be an unpopular move. Thus, after changes to the award (i.e. any defensive player is eligible, no longer just a rising senior defensive player), the number was returned to circulation in 2010 to be exclusively worn by the award winner for that season. Beginning with the 2021 season, award recipients are given the option of wearing a jersey with #38 or retaining their original jersey number with a "38" patch on it.

Winners of the Chucky Mullins Courage Award 

 1990 – Chris Mitchell
 1991 – Jeff Carter
 1992 – Trea Southerland
 1993 – Johnny Dixon
 1994 – Alundice Brice
 1995 – Michael Lowery
 1996 – Derek Jones
 1997 – Nate Wayne
 1998 – Gary Thigpen
 1999 – Ronnie Heard
 2000 – Anthony Magee
 2001 – Kevin Thomas
 2002 – Lanier Goethie
 2003 – Jamil Northcutt
 2004 – Eric Oliver
 2005 – Kelvin Robinson
 2006 – Patrick Willis
 2007 – Jeremy Garrett
 2008 – Jamarca Sanford
 2009 – Marcus Tillman
 2010 – Kentrell Lockett
 2011 – D. T. Shackelford
 2012 – Jason Jones
 2013 – Mike Marry
 2014 – Detarrian (D.T.) Shackleford (2nd award)
 2015 – Mike Hilton
 2016 – John Youngblood
 2017 - Marquis Haynes
 2018 - CJ Moore
 2019 - Austrian Robinson
 2020 - Jaylon Jones
 2021 - Keidron Smith
 2022 - KD Hill

Mullins's story was memorialized in a documentary film, Undefeated: The Chucky Mullins Story and also the SEC Storied Documentary film, "It's Time".

Related
 Former Auburn University defensive back Zach Gilbert, who is a cousin of Mullins, wore number 38 in his honor.
 Former Rebels and 49ers linebacker Patrick Willis was the first recipient of the Chucky Mullins Award after the number was retired.
 A book was written by author Larry Woody about the incident: Dixie Farewell: The Life and Death of Chucky Mullins (1994) Eggman Publishing
 Rev. Jody Hill, a former Ole Miss teammate of Mullins, also wrote a book: 38: The Chucky Mullins Effect (Deeds Publishing (August 12, 2014)).

References

External links

 Undefeated: The Chucky Mullins Story
 The Ole Miss Athlete of the decade – The Daily Mississippian, 1995
 

1969 births
1991 deaths
People from Russellville, Alabama
African-American players of American football
American football cornerbacks
Ole Miss Rebels football players
People with tetraplegia
Sports deaths in Mississippi
Players of American football from Alabama
20th-century African-American sportspeople